The Belvedere Glacier is a valley glacier located above Macugnaga of the Valle Anzasca in the region of Piedmont. The glacier lies at the base of the east face of Monte Rosa. The glacier is mostly covered by rocks.

The glacier is fed by the snows and glaciers on the east side of Monte Rosa, including the Ghiacciaio del Monte Rosa, not to be confused with the Monte Rosagletscher on the Swiss west side, culminating above 4,500 metres, and also the Ghiacciaio Nord delle Loccie on the north side of the Punta delle Loccie.

The glacier gives birth to the Anza, a tributary of the Toce River.

External links
Il ghiacciaio del Belvedere macugnaga-monterosa.it

Glaciers of Italy
Glaciers of the Alps
Monte Rosa